Daas Dev is an Indian Hindi-language romantic political thriller directed by Sudhir Mishra and story concept by Zuhaebb. The film stars Rahul Bhat as Dev Pratap Chauhan, Richa Chadda as Paro, Aditi Rao Hydari as Chandni, and Saurabh Shukla, Vineet Kumar Singh and Dalip Tahil in supporting roles along with Anil George, Deepraj Rana with Anurag Kashyap in a guest appearance. The film was released on 27 April 2018.

Plot
The film starts with a politician giving a speech who dies soon after a helicopter crash. His son Dev grows up and is living a lavish lifestyle and is a drug addict. He owes crores and crores of money to financiers. They kidnap him and when his girlfriend calls one of their well wishers he is rescued. Then his uncle suffers a heart stroke and then Dev returns to claim his father's legacy.

Cast
 Rahul Bhat as Dev Pratap Chauhan
 Richa Chadda as Paro
 Aditi Rao Hydari as Chandni Mehra
 Saurabh Shukla as Awadesh Pratap Chauhan
 Vipin Sharma as Ramashray Shukla
 Yogesh Kumar Mishra as Harsh Paro Boyfriend
 Anurag Kashyap as Vishambhar Pratap Chauhan
 Dalip Tahil as Shrikant Sahay
 Sohaila Kapur as Sushila Devi
 Vineet Kumar Singh as Milan Shukla
 Deepraj Rana as Prabhunath Singh
 Anil George as Naval Singh
Jay Shanker Pandey as Inspector
 Mahesh Chandra Deva as villager Naval singh group

Soundtrack

The film's music was composed by Vipin Patwa, Arko Pravo Mukherjee, Sandesh Shandilya, Anupama Raag and Shamir Tandon while lyrics written by Dr. Sagar, Arko, Munir Niazi, Deepak Ramola, Faiz Ahmed Faiz, Gaurav Solanki, Bulleh Shah and Sameer Anjaan.

References

External links
  
 

Indian political thriller films
2018 films
2010s Hindi-language films
Films directed by Sudhir Mishra
Devdas films
Films based on Indian novels
Films scored by Vipin Patwa
Films based on works by Sarat Chandra Chattopadhyay